Westchester most commonly refers to Westchester County, New York, immediately north of New York City.

It may also refer to:

Geography

Canada
Westchester Station, Nova Scotia, Canada

United States
Town of Westchester, the original seat of Westchester County and now called Westchester Square, Bronx, in New York City
Westchester, Connecticut
Westchester, Florida
Westchester, Illinois
Westchester, Indiana
Westchester, Los Angeles, California

Other uses
Westchester Magazine, covering Westchester County,
The Westchester, a shopping mall in White Plains, Westchester County
Westchester Films, see Shout Factory

See also 
Westchester Stakes (disambiguation)
West Chester (disambiguation)